Dowager Queen Sunan of the Gaeseong Wang clan was a Goryeo Royal Princess as the only daughter of King Taejo and Lady Jeongmok. "Sunan" means the name of Yeongju City in nowadays. The reason why she posthumously honoured as Dowager Queen (왕대비, 王大妃; "Wangdaebi") was unknown since it was not recorded in Goryeosa.

References

Goryeo princesses
Year of birth unknown
Year of death unknown